Meeman-Shelby Forest State Park is a state park in Shelby County, Tennessee near Memphis, located in the Southeastern United States.
The park borders the Mississippi River and contains two lakes— Poplar Tree Lake and Lake Piersol. The Meeman Museum and Nature Center— named for conservationist and journalist Edward J. Meeman, the former editor of the Memphis Press-Scimitar, — is located on the park's grounds.

The unincorporated community Shelby Forest is adjacent to the park.

Attractions and activities available
 Biking trails 
 Boating 
 Cabins 
 Camping 
 Disc Golf course
 Fishing 
 Group Camping 
 Hiking Trails 
 Meeman Museum and Nature Center
 Picnic Facilities 
 Swimming

References

External links
 Meeman-Shelby Forest State Park official website

State parks of Tennessee
Protected areas of Shelby County, Tennessee
Protected areas on the Mississippi River
Nature centers in Tennessee